Clavascidium lacinulatum is a dark brown squamulous terricolous lichen. In Joshua Tree National Park, it is the most common of the biological soil crust lichens.

References

Lichen species
Verrucariales
Taxa named by Erik Acharius
Lichens described in 1810